Manilkara excelsa is a species of plant in the family Sapotaceae. It is endemic to Brazil, and threatened by habitat loss.

References

excelsa
Plants described in 1922
Vulnerable plants
Flora of Brazil
Taxonomy articles created by Polbot